Psychrobacter aestuarii is a Gram-negative, strictly aerobic, non-spore-forming, nonmotile bacterium of the genus Psychrobacter which was isolated from tidal flat sediment in the South Sea in Korea.

References

External links
Type strain of Psychrobacter aestuarii at BacDive -  the Bacterial Diversity Metadatabase

Moraxellaceae
Bacteria described in 2010